Saw Daniel (b. 25 November 1957) is a Burmese politician of Kayah descent and former vice-chairman of the Kayah State Democratic Party (KySDP). He was appointed to the State Administration Council on 3 February 2021, following the 2021 Myanmar coup d'état, and left office on 1 February 2023. On 4 February, KySDP distanced itself from Saw Daniel, announcing it had dismissed Saw Daniel from the party for accepting the appointment, and called for the regime to honor the 2020 election results.

Saw Daniel contested the 2015 election as a KNDP candidate and the 2020 election as a KySDP candidate, losing both elections to an NLD candidate.

References 

People from Kayah State
Living people
1957 births
Members of the State Administration Council
Specially Designated Nationals and Blocked Persons List
Individuals related to Myanmar sanctions